The NYU Violets men's basketball team is the college basketball team that represents New York University, located in New York City.  The team currently competes in NCAA Division III as a member of the University Athletic Association.  NYU previously competed as an NCAA Division I program until 1971, when the team was disbanded due to a budget crisis.  The team was reinstated in 1983 as a Division III program.

NYU played in two NCAA Division I Final Fours, and can lay claim to two national championships predating the creation of the NCAA tournament (1920 and 1935).  NYU has also had success in the Division III NCAA tournament, including a runner-up finish at the 1994 tournament.

Division I history

While a member of Division I, the Violets' basketball team registered a great deal of success. An early member who starred for the team in 1910 and 1911 was Lazarus Joseph (1891–1966), later a NY State Senator and New York City Comptroller.

The school's best NCAA tournament result was finishing runner-up to Oklahoma State (then Oklahoma A&M), coached by the legendary Henry Iba. at the 1945 NCAA tournament.  NYU returned to the Final Four in 1960, losing to Ohio State, whose roster featured Jerry Lucas and John Havlicek.

NYU achieved even more success in the years before the advent of the NCAA tournament in 1939.  In 1920 NYU won the Amateur Athletic Union national championship tournament, led by the Helms Athletic Foundation Player of the Year, Howard Cann.  Cann returned to coach at NYU after graduation, serving as head basketball coach from 1923 to 1958 and leading NYU to notable success.  The Violets were undefeated in the 1933–1934 season, posting a 16–0 record.  After winning the first ten games to start the following season, the school's winning streak was broken in an overtime loss at Yale.  The loss to Yale was the only setback during the 1934–1935 season, during which NYU finished 19–1 and was named the best team in the nation (retrospectively) by the Helms Athletic Foundation and the Premo-Porretta Power Poll. Finally, the year before the NCAA tournament was created, NYU reached the Final Four at the 1938 National Invitation Tournament.

For the seasons before the AP Poll began ranking college basketball teams in 1949, the Premo-Porretta Poll retrospectively ranks NYU among the final top 5 teams nationally for a number of seasons, including #1 in 1935, #2 in 1909 and 1934, #3 in 1920, #4 in 1921, and #5 in 1930.  NYU also appeared in the first AP Poll issued, on January 18, 1949.  The school made its final appearance in the Division I AP Poll ranked at #10 on December 24, 1964.

The Violets' most recent post-season accomplishment as a Division I college was finishing as the runner-up to BYU in the 1966 National Invitation Tournament.  NYU previously also finished as runner-up in the 1948 National Invitation Tournament, and in third place in the 1959 National Invitation Tournament.

NYU was a member of the Metropolitan New York Conference from 1933 to 1963, and won four conference titles after the conference officially began sponsoring men's basketball in 1946.

The program was disbanded following a disastrous 5–20 season in 1970–71.  When NYU ended its program, the Violets were still tied for 14th nationally in Final Four appearances (2), and 28th nationally in all-time appearances at the NCAA Division I tournament (6).

Division III history
NYU has once again found success since its reestablishment as a Division III program in 1983.

The school appeared in seven consecutive Division III NCAA basketball tournaments from 1992 to 1998.  In 1994 NYU advanced to the Final Four and finished as the national runner-up to Lebanon Valley College.  The 1994 team also established a school record by winning 25 games.

Postseason history

Division I NCAA
In their times in Division I, the Violets appeared in the NCAA Tournament six times. Their record was 9–8.

NIT
NYU appeared in 8 NIT Tournaments was 13–11 in the NIT.

Individual accolades

The following NYU players and coaches are in the Naismith Memorial Basketball Hall of Fame (with induction year):
Nat Holman (1964)
Howard Cann (1968)
Dolph Schayes (1973)
Satch Sanders (2011), inducted as a contributor

National and Metro honors 
NYU players and coaches have won the following national and regional awards:

Player honors
 Helms Foundation College Basketball Player of the YearNational player of the year
Howard Cann – 1920

 MBWA Haggerty AwardNYC Metro college basketball player of the year
Ben Auerbach – 1940
Sid Tanenbaum – 1946, 1947
Dolph Schayes – 1948
Satch Sanders – 1960
Barry Kramer – 1963

Coaching honors
MBWA Division I Coach of the Year
Howard Cann – 1948

Conference honors 
The University Athletic Association began awarding Conference Player of the Year and Coaching Staff of the Year awards when it was founded in 1987.

 Player of the Year
Adam Crawford – 1994
Jesse Determann – 1998
Jason Boone – 2006

 Coaching Staff of the Year
Joe Nesci – 1993, 1994, 2012

References

External links